Bermius brachycerus is a species of short-horned grasshopper in the family Acrididae. It is found in Australia.

It was first described in 1878 by Carl Stål.

Subspecies
These subspecies belong to the species Bermius brachycerus:
 Bermius brachycerus brachycerus Stål, 1878 (Garden Bermius)
 Bermius brachycerus magistralis Rehn, 1957
 Bermius brachycerus planicola Rehn, 1957

References

External links

 

Oxyinae
Taxa named by Carl Stål
Insects described in 1878